Brett Lernout (born September 24, 1995) is a Canadian professional ice hockey defenceman who is currently an unrestricted free agent who most recently played with the Colorado Eagles in the American Hockey League (AHL). Lernout was drafted by the Montreal Canadiens in the third round (73rd total) in 2014.

Playing career
In December 2014, he signed a three-year deal with the Canadiens. In 2015 after the end of his junior career with the Saskatoon Blades and the Swift Current Broncos, he reported to the Hamilton Bulldogs (the Canadiens AHL affiliate at the time) and played the last six games of their season.

Lernout played the bulk of the 2015–16 season with the St. John's IceCaps, the Canadien's new AHL farm team, but was called up after a string of injuries to Canadiens' defencemen. He played his first NHL game on April 2, 2016, but suffered a season-ending injury during his eighth shift. A similar situation caused him to be called up again the next year.

After five seasons within the Canadiens organization, Lenout left as a free agent to sign a one-year, two-way $700,000 contract with the Vegas Golden Knights on July 1, 2019. In the following 2019–20 season, Lernout was assigned to AHL affiliate, the Chicago Wolves, after attending the Golden Knights 2019 training camp. He remained with the Wolves for the duration of his contract with the Golden Knights, registering just 2 assists through 38 regular season games from the blueline before the season was cancelled due to the COVID-19 pandemic.

Having left the Golden Knights as a free agent, Lernout was un-signed leading into the pandemic delayed 2020–21 season. On February 10, 2021, he was signed to a professional tryout agreement to join the Colorado Eagles of the AHL, the primary affiliate to the Colorado Avalanche. Adding experience and leadership to a young Eagles, blueline, Lernout posted 3 assists through 12 regular season games before he was released from his tryout on April 18, 2021.

Career statistics

References

External links
 

1995 births
Living people
Canadian ice hockey defencemen
Chicago Wolves players
Colorado Eagles players
Hamilton Bulldogs (AHL) players
Laval Rocket players
Montreal Canadiens draft picks
Montreal Canadiens players
St. John's IceCaps players
Saskatoon Blades players
Ice hockey people from Winnipeg
Steinbach Pistons players
Swift Current Broncos players